The Scottish Women's Football League (SWFL) is a group of women's football divisions in Scotland. The league is owned and managed by Scottish Women's Football (SWF), an affiliated body of the Scottish Football Association (SFA). The league currently has 35 clubs in three regional divisions.

Following on from the national league of the Scottish Women's Football Association founded in 1972, the SWFL was formed by clubs and the SWFA in 1999 as the country's top four women's league tiers. The SWFL now comprises the fourth tier of the Scottish league system, following the breakaway of its Premier Division to create the Scottish Women's Premier League (SWPL) in 2002, and the subsequent addition of SWPL 2 and the SWF Championship.

From 1999 until 2015, the SWFL First Division (SWFL 1) was the second tier of Scottish women's football.

History

The modern Scottish women's leagues began in 1972–73, when Westthorn United won the national title. League systems in the 1990s included a tiered divisional system, or feeder leagues in the North, East and West of Scotland, as well as an Inter-Region Cup. The top division was known from 1997 to 1999 as the Sports Connection Premier for sponsorship reasons, in the Sports Connection Women's Scottish League.

The Scottish Women's Football League was formed on 6 November 1999, with the top four national divisions: the Premier Division, First, Second and Third Division. The League had 46 clubs in 2000.

The SWFL Premier Division constituted the top division in Scottish women's football from 1999–2000 until 2001–02. Three clubs became national champions in those seasons: Cumbernauld, Ayr United, and F.C. Kilmarnock. The women's Ayrshire derby, Ayr–Kilmarnock, was a key match in the national title race in each season in the early 2000s.

Ayr United were Scotland's first representative in the UEFA Women's Cup in 2001–02, as a group host at Somerset Park. Kilmarnock played in the 2002–03 tournament in Austria.

Below the Premier division, the First Division (SWFL 1) and Second Division (SWFL 2) existed from 1999 until 2019.

The Third Division was the national fourth-tier league founded by the SWFL in 1999. The most prominent member of the Third Division in 1999–2000 was Third Lanark, a women's team formed 22 years after the disbandment of the Third Lanark A.C. men's team and playing its games at Cathkin Park. Falkirk Ladies won promotion from the Third Division in 1999–2000; later seasons' champions were Baillieston (2000–01), and F.C. Kilmarnock Girls (2002–03). The division was separated into two groups, the West and East, each with eight clubs in 2004–05, and seven and eight respectively in 2006–07. They became the Third Division North and South, each with nine clubs, in 2007–08. This league tier was disbanded by 2010.

In 2002, the SWFL's twelve-team top division broke away to form the SWPL, leaving the remaining thirty clubs in the SWFL. In 2016, the SWPL expanded to two divisions, meaning the SWFL was now at the third and fourth tiers of the league structure.

In the reorganisation in 2016, the national SWFL First Division (SWFL 1) split into two regionalised leagues (North and South), above the Second Division (SWFL 2) with four regionalised leagues. The SWF Championship was created in 2020 as the new third tier of the 'Performance' category of the Scottish game. The Championship retained the existing North–South divisions but replaced the SWFL First Division, which was officially discontinued, as was the Second Division. The new fourth tier, named the SWFL, operated regional divisions in a separate 'Recreational' category, with no automatic promotion or relegation for its clubs.

These divisions were reorganised in 2023 and a short season began from January to May 2023 before a winter season from August 2023. The leagues are also integrated into the "pyramid" and promotion and relegation with League 1 introduced.

Cup competitions
The League Cup, originating from the 1970s, was latterly known as the Scottish Women's Football League First Division Cup from 2012 when an additional Second Division Cup was introduced. Following the 2019 reorganisation, this reverted to a single SWFL League Cup competition, with a 'Plate' for clubs eliminated in the opening round.

SWFL teams also compete in the primary national cup competition, the Scottish Women's Cup.

2022 clubs
The following teams are playing in the SWFL in the 2022 season. As well as first teams, the SWFL divisions also incorporate a number of development or youth teams of other Scottish League clubs.

North/East
 Alloa Athletic
 Bayside Women
 Buchan Ladies United
 Dryburgh Athletic
 Dunfermline Athletic
 East Fife Development
 Forfar Farmington
 McDermid Ladies
 Stonehaven
 Westdyke Ladies Thistle

West/South West
 Annan Athletic
 Ayr United Development
 Clark Drive
 Cumnock Juniors
 Dalbeattie Star
 Drumchapel United
 Harmony Row
 Kilwinning
 Nithsdale Wanderers
 Queen of the South
 Stewarton United

Central/South East
 Bonnyrigg Rose
 Central Girls
 Clydebank
 Dunipace
 Edinburgh South
 Falkirk Development
 Linlithgow Rose
 Livingston Development
 Lothian
 Motherwell Development
 Murieston United
 Musselburgh Windsor
 Rutherglen
 West Park United

Seasons
Champions and runners-up of the SWFL Premier Division, 1999–2002:

For seasons and champions in the other divisions from 1999 to 2019, see SWFL First Division (SWFL 1) and SWFL Second Division (SWFL 2).

The following clubs are the winners of the SWFL regional divisions since 2020:

See also
 Highlands and Islands League

References

 
Women's football leagues in Scotland
Amateur association football
Sports leagues established in 1999
1999 establishments in Scotland